Truman Bodden Law School (previously known as Cayman Islands Law School) is a law school based in George Town, Cayman Islands affiliated with the University of Liverpool in the UK.  It was founded in 1982.

The school offers two qualifications:
Full and part-time programmes leading to the Bachelor of Law (Honours) Degree of the University of Liverpool 
and attorney at law qualification of the Cayman Islands.

References

External links

Universities and colleges in the Cayman Islands
Organizations established in 1982
1982 establishments in the Cayman Islands
George Town, Cayman Islands
Caymanian law